The Subaru Outback is an automotive nameplate used by the Japanese automaker Subaru for two different vehicles: a crossover station wagon, the Outback (1994–present, also sold as  in some markets), and an Impreza-derived hatchback, the Outback Sport (1994–2011).

Most versions of the Outback wagon and Outback Sport have had all-wheel drive as standard equipment.

Overview

The original Outback station wagon was derived from the wagon variant of the second-generation Subaru Legacy. The first-generation Legacy, which made its debut in 1989, did not receive the cosmetic and suspension modifications to create an Outback version, although Subaru offered an Outdoor option package for the 1994 model year Legacy L all-wheel drive model, which added an compressed air strut height adjustable suspension, a luggage rack, a skidplate, and mud flaps.

Earlier, a raised-roof "Touring Wagon" variant had been offered on the preceding Subaru Leone for the 1988 and 1989 model years. Subaru also sold a raised-roof variant (chassis code BF) of the first-generation Legacy wagon outside the United States. North American Legacy wagons were only offered as the flat-roof variant (chassis code BJ) until a special "GT" model was marketed for the 1994 model year.

The second-generation Legacy wagon became the first generation of the Outback crossover series, called the "Legacy Grand Wagon" in Japan in 1995, and the "Legacy Outback" in most other markets. Compared to the existing Legacy wagon, the "Outback" variant added partial protective plastic side body cladding for off-road conditions, used a raised roof, and would later raise the suspension to provide additional ground clearance. It was introduced at the 1994 New York Auto Show. Aside from other small differences in trim, the Outback shares almost all of its components with the Legacy donor model.

When launched in Australia in 1996, the name "Legacy Outback" was shortened to "Outback", followed in other markets afterwards. In the United States, Subaru also retailed the Legacy SUS sedan between the 1997 and 2007 model years, with similar modifications to distinguish it from the equivalent Legacy model sedan. The Impreza Outback Sport was introduced at the 1996 New York Auto Show, but for the 1997 model year, the donor model names were dropped, and the cars were known as the "Outback" and "Outback Sport".

First generation (BD/BG; 1994)

In 1994 Subaru used the second generation of the Legacy wagon as the basis for the first generation of the Outback wagon, which came equipped with the same 2.2L EJ22 engine used in the Legacy. The 1995 model year Legacy Outback wagon was largely limited to cosmetic changes, featuring two-tone paint, larger wheels and tires, mud flaps, a roof rack, and upgraded upholstery, similar to the modifications on the previous 1994 model year Legacy Outdoor trim. Production of the Outback was approved by Fuji Heavy Industries CEO Isamu Kawai.

This change was brought about in response to changing consumer tastes for a more durable and utility based wagon. It was marketed as the world's first sport-utility wagon. In Japan, the Legacy Grand Wagon was the equivalent of the Outback, released almost simultaneously in August 1995.

Encapsulating the sport theme of the Outback wagon, Subaru hired Paul Hogan, star of the movie Crocodile Dundee, as a pitchman for the vehicle. The ad campaign, which debuted in fall 1995 for the 1996 model year, cost an estimated $20–22 million and included TV ads in which Hogan and an unnamed female companion outrun competing sport-utility vehicles by virtue of the Outback's superior stability, handling, braking, and fuel economy. The advertisements successfully raised sales, with nearly 20,000 Outbacks sold in the nine months following the start of the campaign. Hogan, a former car salesman, reportedly warned Subaru "You better be able to build a lot of these [Outbacks] because I'm going to sell the hell out of them."

The sedan version of the Outback, which debuted for the 1997 model year, was initially marketed as an experimental limited run of 300 units exclusively available in New England. Known as the Legacy SUS (Sport Utility Sedan), it was developed at the urging of Ernie Boch Jr., the owner of the independent Subaru distributor for the Northeast. The model moved to nationwide availability for the 1998 model year.

Second generation (BE/BH; 1999)

Subaru released a similarly altered second generation Outback as part of the third generation Legacy lineup in 1998. The second generation Outbacks were longer and wider than their predecessors.

In North America, the new Outback and Legacy were introduced in 1999 for model year 2000. The Legacy SUS became the Outback sedan.

Although most markets used the Outback nameplate, the raised-suspension version was called the Legacy Lancaster in Japan. The new Legacy family was released in Japan in December  1998.

This generation also saw the introduction of the 3.0-liter EZ30, the first Subaru six-cylinder engine outside of the sporty Alcyone and SVX lines. The EZ30 was introduced at the New York Auto Show in April 2000, equipped in two separate models, including one that was co-branded with the Maine-based retailer L.L.Bean. The equivalent Lancaster 6 was marketed in Japan starting in May 2000.

Third generation (BL/BP; 2003)

The fourth-generation Legacy formed the basis for a third-generation Outback. The third-generation Outback was unveiled at the Frankfurt Motor Show in September 2003, offered with either the 2.5-liter EJ25 or 3.0-liter EZ30 engine.

Introduction was delayed in North America until January 2004 for the 2005 model year. A turbocharged 2.5-liter EJ25 was added to the range in North America. The 2.5XT trim was sold as a limited edition in Japan starting in 2008 to celebrate the 50th anniversary of Subaru. Wheelbase and overall length grew for the new generation.

The interior and exterior styling of the entire Legacy series, including the Outback, was updated in mid-2006. The Outback sedan, which had been limited to the North American market, was discontinued after the 2007 model year. At the same time, the Legacy wagon was dropped, leaving Subaru with only a single sedan (Legacy) and wagon (Outback) for the mid-size car market in North America.

Fourth generation (BR/BM; 2009)

The fourth-generation Outback arrived with the 2009 debut of the fifth generation Legacy, marketed as 2010 model year vehicles in North America, and called the Outback worldwide. The fourth-generation Outback was introduced at the New York International Auto Show in April 2009. A concept Legacy previewing size, styling, and the new EZ36 flat-6 had been shown at the North American International Auto Show in Detroit three months earlier, in January 2009.

The EZ30 was replaced with a new 3.6-liter EZ36, offering increased displacement with the same exterior dimensions. The EZ36 also provided increased power using regular unleaded fuel. The 2.5-liter EJ25 flat-4 was retained for the base model. In Europe, the Outback was also available with the 2.0-liter EE20 turbodiesel. The turbocharged EJ25 was dropped from the line.

Japanese dealers began selling the new Outback in May 2009. The European debut of the Outback in August 2009 was accompanied by a press release billing the model as a pioneer in the crossover segment.

The styling was refreshed for the 2013 model year and base models switched to the 2.5-liter FB25 engine, as announced at the 2012 New York Auto Show. The 2013 model year was also the first time Subaru's advanced driver-assistance system, a stereoscopic camera-based system branded EyeSight, was available in North America.

One of the more interesting features introduced from 2016 was tailgate PIN access. Found only on push-button start models, the tailgate features an extra button to the right of the tailgate release button that can be used to enter a PIN, morse-code style, to unlock the car in the lieu of having the fob. The promoted purpose is to allow access to the car where you have deliberately locked the fob inside the car (e.g.: when going to the beach), or if a child or pet has locked themselves inside the car (saves breaking a window). This feature is now available across all Subaru models (including sedans) across all year models that feature push-button start.

Fifth generation (BS; 2014)

The fifth-generation Outback appeared in 2014 for the 2015 year model with the sixth generation Legacy, still badged the Legacy Outback for Japan. The sixth-generation Legacy was previewed as a concept at the Los Angeles Auto Show in November 2013; the Legacy sedan was premiered at Chicago in February 2014, with the Outback following at New York in April. An unrelated Legacy-based "sports tourer" wagon, the Subaru Levorg, was shown in 2013 and first sold in 2014. Elsewhere, the Outback became a free-standing model line of its own, independent of the Legacy, thus bringing greater product differentiation between the two.

Subaru billed the exterior styling evolution as being shaped by the concept of 'more Outback', claiming to combine the strengths of passenger cars and sport-utility vehicles and capitalizing on the brand recognition gained from selling the Outback since 1995. EyeSight was offered for the first time in the European market on the new Outback. Chassis stiffness was improved for the fifth-generation Outback.  To reduce aerodynamic drag, the side view mirrors were mounted on the sheet metal of the front doors rather than the base of the A-pillar, as was the case with previous models. 

From 2018, some world markets also offered Subaru Adaptive Driving Beam (ADB) that allow a driver to leave their high beam switched on at all times, and in combination with EyeSight, adjust a series of shutters that cover portions of the high beam light projection to prevent dazzling oncoming drivers whilst maintaining visibility of the rest of the road, or to "draw a box" of low beam around a lead vehicle that adjusts left and right working with SRH in line with that vehicle's movement. Other additions include front and side cameras along with Apple Carplay and Android Auto, and the ability to change the colour of the combination meter illuminated rings to one of eleven different colours.

The fifth-generation Subaru Outback is now classified as a 'crossover', with the body and wheelbase set larger than previous models. Other technical changes such as the larger  3.6L EZ36 engine have pushed it into this classification. The Outback received a Top Safety Pick award from the IIHS, an ASV+ rating from JNCAP, and five stars from NHTSA.

The fifth-generation Outback retained the same 2.5-liter FB25 and 3.6-liter EZ36 engines from the 2013 refresh; the FB25 was slightly revised to improve mid-range torque. In China, the uplevel engine was a turbocharged 2.0-liter FA20F instead of the EZ36. In the United States, the Outback was only offered with a single transmission choice, Subaru's continuously variable transmission branded Lineartronic. In Canada, a manual transmission was available with the 2.5-litre Base and Touring models until 2017.

Sixth generation (BT; 2020)

The sixth-generation Subaru Outback for the North American market was unveiled at the New York Auto Show on April 17, 2019. Full production started from July 29, 2019. This redesigned Outback keeps the same body style (wagon/crossover SUV), while still receiving a few changes, such as new taillights (similar to the ones on the Forester and upcoming Legacy) and an updated, modern interior.

Internally, the 2020 Outback moves to the Subaru Global Platform, which is stiffer and offers a common base to allow use of alternative powertrains, such as hybrid or all-electric. The base model sixth-generation Outback was offered with the 2.5-liter gasoline direct-injection FB25D; a turbocharged 2.4-liter FA24F that was first used on the Subaru Ascent was offered as the uplevel engine, providing improved power, torque, and consumption compared to the discontinued EZ36.

In addition to all-wheel drive coming standard on every trim, the 2021 model year also added LED adaptive steering-responsive headlights (SRH) on premium variants and a seat-belt reminder standard for all passengers.

World markets outside of North America, including Japan, did not launch the sixth generation Outback until 2021.

Australia launched on the 20th February 2021 with a number of differences over the North American version including updated LED headlights with combined Day Running Light and turn/direction indicator with SRH (Steering Responsive Headlights) standard across all variants (the Touring model also gained Adaptive Driving Beam (ADB) until 2023 when ADB became standard across all model variants), as is pushbutton-start with tailgate PIN access. There is improved camera resolution for rear, side and front driver assistance cameras, EyeSight 4.0 with roadside speed sign reading, adjustable speed limiting, and intersection crash avoidance utilising new EyeSight cameras with a wider field of view and a lower profile inside the cabin. Subaru claim the sole engine fitted to Australian Outbacks, the revised 2.5-litre FB25D, is made of 90% new components compared to the Gen5 engine as well. The Japanese Outback was announced on October 7, 2021; in Japan the Outback is offered exclusively with the 1.8-litre CB18 gasoline direct-injection turbo engine instead.

In September 2021, the European variant received a five-star rating by the European New Car Assessment Programme (EuroNCAP) 2021.

For the 2022 model year, Subaru added a new trim level, the Wilderness. Outback Wilderness features 9.5 inches of ground clearance, turbocharged 2.4-liter FA24F engine, and re-tuned transmission gearing with revised front and rear gear ratios. Marketed for off-road use, the Outback Wilderness has 17" wheels with standard all-terrain tires, enhanced body cladding, and synthetic upholstery.

Outback Sport

Subaru also released the first generation Impreza-based Outback Sport in 1994 to North America only for the 1995 model year. Derived from the Impreza hatchback, the Outback Sport initially featured an off-road appearance package with two-tone paint; otherwise, the mechanics of the platform were unchanged.

First generation (1994–2001)

The first Impreza Outback Sport was introduced for the 1995 model year as a trim line based on the "L Active Safety Group", which included all-wheel-drive and front and rear disc anti-lock brakes. The standard engine was a 1.8-liter EJ18 with a manual transmission, but an automatic transmission was available exclusively with the larger 2.2-liter EJ22 from the Legacy.

The Outback Sport was priced lower and aimed at a younger buyer than the Legacy-based Outback. Advertisements for the Outback Sport featured an actor who referred to Paul Hogan as his "uncle".

Second generation (2001–2007)

Subaru in North America launched the subsequent generation in 2001 for the 2002 model year based on the second generation Impreza. In Australia, the Impreza RV incorporated similar styling changes.

Third generation (2007–2011)

Subaru in North America launched the subsequent generation in 2007 for model year 2008 based on the third generation Impreza.

Subaru introduced the Impreza XV exclusively for the European market at the 2010 Geneva Motor Show. The XV adopted the same changes that were made for the USDM Outback Sport, but the concept XV used the 2.0-liter turbodiesel EE20 or 2.0-liter turbo EJ20 engines available in other European Impreza variants. In Australia, the XV replaced the RV line, equipped with the naturally aspirated EJ20. It is succeeded by the Subaru XV/Crosstrek.

Sales

References

External links

Outback
Cars introduced in 1994
Crossover sport utility vehicles
Station wagons
Cars powered by boxer engines